Tatyana Borisova (born 3 June 1975) is a Kyrgyzstani middle distance runner who specializes in the 1500 metres. She represented her country at the 2004 Summer Olympics, where she ran in the qualifiers of the 1500 m.

Borisova has competed at the IAAF World Cross Country Championships twice (in 2002 and 2003), and also in the IAAF World Championships in Athletics twice, running in the 1500 m in 2001 and 2003. She later moved on to longer distances, winning the Austin Marathon in 2004 and 2005. She also ran at the Pune Half Marathon in 2004, finishing in third position.

She enjoyed a resurgence at the 2010 Asian Indoor Athletics Championships, winning a silver medal in the 800 metres and 1500 m bronze.

Competition record

Personal bests
800 metres - 2:01.70 min (2004)
1500 metres - 4:07.08 min (2004)
3000 metres - 9:34.60 min (2003, indoor)
Half marathon - 1:12:30 hrs (2004)

References

External links
 
 

1975 births
Living people
Kyrgyzstani female middle-distance runners
Asian Games medalists in athletics (track and field)
Athletes (track and field) at the 2002 Asian Games
Athletes (track and field) at the 2006 Asian Games
Athletes (track and field) at the 2010 Asian Games
Athletes (track and field) at the 2004 Summer Olympics
Olympic athletes of Kyrgyzstan
Asian Games silver medalists for Kyrgyzstan
World Athletics Championships athletes for Kyrgyzstan
Medalists at the 2002 Asian Games
Kyrgyzstani people of Russian descent
20th-century Kyrgyzstani women
21st-century Kyrgyzstani women